Silver Ayoo (born 26 November 1950) is a Ugandan former athlete who competed as a sprinter in 400 metre events. He represented Uganda at the 1972 Summer Olympics and 1980 Summer Olympics.

Ayoo took part in the 400 metres race at the 1972 Summer Olympics and was eliminated in the opening heats.

At the 1973 All-Africa Games in Lagos, Ayoo was a bronze medallist in the 400 metres hurdles.

Ayoo won a silver and bronze medal at the 1974 British Commonwealth Games, in the 400 metres and 4 x 400 metres relay respectively.

He missed the 1976 Summer Olympics as Uganda were one of the countries that boycotted.

Back at the Olympics in 1980 he improved on his previous performance in the 400 metres by progressing to the quarter-finals. He was also a member of Uganda's 4 × 400 metres relay team at those games.

References

External links
Silver Ayoo at Sports-Reference

1950 births
Living people
Ugandan male sprinters
Olympic athletes of Uganda
Athletes (track and field) at the 1972 Summer Olympics
Athletes (track and field) at the 1980 Summer Olympics
Commonwealth Games silver medallists for Uganda
Commonwealth Games bronze medallists for Uganda
Commonwealth Games medallists in athletics
Athletes (track and field) at the 1974 British Commonwealth Games
African Games bronze medalists for Uganda
African Games medalists in athletics (track and field)
Athletes (track and field) at the 1973 All-Africa Games
20th-century Ugandan people
21st-century Ugandan people
Medallists at the 1974 British Commonwealth Games